is a Japanese professional baseball player from Sakurai, Nara Prefecture, Japan. He was with the Hanshin Tigers from 2004 until 2010.

References

Baseball Reference

1979 births
Living people
Baseball people from Nara Prefecture
Nippon Professional Baseball outfielders
Japanese baseball players
Hanshin Tigers players